Oliver Domke (born 22 March 1976) is a German former field hockey player. He competed at the 1996 Summer Olympics and the 2000 Summer Olympics.

References

External links
 

1976 births
Living people
German male field hockey players
Olympic field hockey players of Germany
Field hockey players at the 1996 Summer Olympics
Field hockey players at the 2000 Summer Olympics
People from Rüsselsheim
Sportspeople from Darmstadt (region)
1998 Men's Hockey World Cup players
2002 Men's Hockey World Cup players